Galwa is a small town in the mid-western region of Nepal. It is located at 29°40'0N 81°52'0E at an altitude of 1662 m (5456 ft) near to the Karnali River.

References

Populated places in Humla District